Samuel Henrique Alves (born 14 June 1991) is a Brazilian footballer who currently plays as a defender for Japanese side Maruyasu Okazaki, on loan from SC Sagamihara.

Club career
Alves signed for Sagamihara in early 2017. He made his debut in a 1–0 loss to Nagano Parceiro.

Career statistics

Club

Notes

References

External links

 JLeague Profile

1991 births
Living people
Brazilian footballers
Brazilian expatriate footballers
Association football defenders
Clube Atlético Mineiro players
Goiás Esporte Clube players
Araxá Esporte Clube players
Atlético Clube Goianiense players
Guarany Sporting Club players
G.D. Vitória de Sernache players
Toledo Esporte Clube players
Goianésia Esporte Clube players
SC Sagamihara players
Campeonato Brasileiro Série D players
J3 League players
Brazilian expatriate sportspeople in Japan
Brazilian expatriate sportspeople in Portugal
Expatriate footballers in Japan
Expatriate footballers in Portugal
Footballers from Belo Horizonte